Justice Reese may refer to:

William B. Reese (judge), associate justice of the Tennessee Supreme Court
Manoah B. Reese, associate justice of the Nebraska Supreme Court

See also
Justice Rees (disambiguation)